Future Spa is a solid state, wide body, pinball machine produced in 1979 by Bally Manufacturing. It was Bally's first machine with continuous background sound and in-line drop targets.  Notable game features include: Flippers (2), Pop bumpers (5), Slingshot (1), Spinning targets (2), Kick-out hole (1), Star rollover (1), 4-in-line drop targets, Left kicker lane, Left out-lane detour gate.

It was unique in the fact that it had recessed back-box lighting and prismatic diffuser behind the "Future Spa" logo for a holographic effect.  The holographic effect was an idea of Norm Clark. He wanted to do this already on Magic Town / Magic City while working at Williams but it was regarded to be too expensive.  The marketing slogan from the Bally flyer read: "Future Spa will awaken your pinball senses"

References

External links 
 

Bally pinball machines
1979 pinball machines